Robert L. Patton High School commonly referred to as "Patton High School", is a public high school in Morganton, North Carolina.  The school opened in 2007.  The school mascot is a panther, with the school colors being red, black, and white. Pattons rival school is Freedom High School, which is also in Morganton. The schools are 5.9 miles apart. Patton competes in athletics in the North Carolina High School Athletic Association, and is a 2A school. The Panthers are currently a member of the Northwest Foothills Conference for sports, along with two other Burke county schools, East Burke and Draughn.

References

External links
Just Stepped Out, Robert Patton of Burke County

Public high schools in North Carolina
Educational institutions established in 2007
2007 establishments in North Carolina
Schools in Burke County, North Carolina